is a series of Japanese adult visual novels and strategy video games primarily developed and published by BaseSon for the Windows and is based on the classic 14th century Chinese novel Romance of the Three Kingdoms by Luo Guanzhong. The first game was developed by BaseSon, and was first released on January 26, 2007, for Windows as two DVD-ROMs, followed by a re-release on April 11, 2008, containing an extra CD-ROM.

Koihime Musō: Doki Otome Darake no Sangokushi Engi has made several transitions to other media. A manga adaptation by Japanese illustrator Yayoi Hizuki was first serialized in the Japanese magazine Dengeki G's Festival! Comic on April 26, 2008. An anime adaptation produced by Doga Kobo began broadcasting on July 8, 2008, and has since released two additional seasons.

Premise

The game is set in ancient China during and after the fall of the Han dynasty with some major differences, most notably; Most of the male characters in the novel have become female and The Three Kingdoms that were formed after the Han Dynasty, had already been established. Despite each kingdom being ruled by an independent monarchy, the three kingdoms are still loyal to the Han empire. However, the empire is on the verge of collapse as civil unrest, banditry and infighting bring turmoil to the nation.

As the empire finally collapse and warlords wage war with each other, amidst the turmoil several major factions are formed, ready to rule and unite the fractured nation. These major factions (5 in Koihime Musō, 7 in the sequel) are the Shoku faction (Chinese: 蜀, Shǔ) led by Kazuto Hongō in Koihime Musō and in the sequel, Queen Ryūbi (Liu Bei) of the Kingdom of Shu, the Gi faction (Chinese: 魏, Wèi) led by Queen Sōsō (Cao Cao) of the Kingdom of Wei, the Go faction (Chinese: 吳, Wú) led by Princess Sonken (Sun Quan) of the Kingdom of Wu and in the sequel, her older sister Queen Sonsaku (Sun Ce), the Tōtaku faction (Chinese: 董卓, Dong Zhuo) led by Governess Tōtaku, Governor of Dong province, the En/Yuan faction led by Lady Enshō, Lord of Yuan province, and in the sequel the Kōkintō/Yellow Turban Rebels led by the Zhang sisters, Chōkaku, Chōhō and Chōryō and the Nanban/Southern Barbarians led by Mōkaku.

Gameplay

The gameplay in Koihime Musō follows a linear plot line, which offers pre-determined scenarios and courses of interaction, and focuses on the appeal of the female main characters.

Development
Koihime Musō is the fifth game developed by BaseSon, known for creating their first title, One2: Eien no Yakusoku, sequel to Tactics' One: Kagayaku Kisetsu e. Direction and planning for Kohime Musō was done by K. Baggio, who has also provided scenario used in the game, along with fellow writers Izumi Kumashiro, Takuya Aoyama, Assault, and Shiina Arai. Art direction and character designs were split between five people, Kanan Yatsuha, Kantaka, Hinata Katagiri, Eiji Hikage, and Hokuto Saeki. Music in the game was provided by Takumaru, Ryō Mizutsuki, and Ichinoryū Uehara.

Release
Koihime Musō was first available to public on January 26, 2007, as an adult game playable only on Microsoft Windows PCs as two DVD-ROMs. It was subsequently followed by a re-release on April 11, 2008. While the gameplay and scenario in the game is essentially the same, an extra fandisc not available in the original version titled  was included with the re-release as a CD-ROM. An enhanced re-release of Koihime Musō,  was released on December 26, 2008, with extended scenario. An English translation of Koihime Musō was released by European publisher MangaGamer on February 28, 2011. Additionally, Gamania formally launched a web-browser based MMO strategy game titled  on December 7, 2010, which has since been running on eight different servers. The game allows players to control up to 5 generals at a time from the Shin Koihime Musō cast, join one of the 3 warring factions and try to conquer players of the other two opposing factions with the Red Turban Bandit faction acting as a NPC faction. Like most other browser based MMOs, this game is free to play with a Gamania account, however paying users gain access to enhancements otherwise unavailable or very difficult to obtain.

A PlayStation 2 version, titled  developed by Yeti and published by Regista was released on October 30, 2008. A new version of Koihime with many new characters  was released on December 26, 2008. A third version of Koihime  was released on July 23, 2010. MangaGamer acquired licensing rights to the first game and released it on February 28, 2011. June 2012 the website Jlist.com began selling copies of Koihime Musō as a DX version with restored voices; in a partnership with MangaGamer. Another game named Koihime Eiyūtan has been announced; however, it is unknown if it is a follow-up or a remake of a preceding game.  In 2017, 28 June the release of the first part of the Kakumei trilogy with the title - . The release of the second part is the title -  scheduled for 2018, 27 Jule. The release of the third is the title -  scheduled for 2019.

A 2D fighting game titled  has been announced for a January 28, 2016 release on the PlayStation 3 and PlayStation 4.

Media

Manga
A manga adaptation based on the original visual novel drawn by Japanese illustrator Yayoi Hizuki, with its title renamed as  began serialization in the second issue of the manga magazine Dengeki G's Festival! Comic published by ASCII Media Works on April 26, 2008.

Anime

An anime adaptation produced by Doga Kobo began broadcasting in Japan on July 8, 2008 on the Tokyo MX and the Chiba TV broadcasting networks, followed by other broadcasting networks later during the same month. The anime television series, with its title shortened to simply Koihime Musō, featured a story very different from that found in the original visual novel. The original protagonist, Hongo Kazuto, is not present in the anime, nor does the grand battle between the three kingdoms take place. Instead, it feature Kan'u's adventure in China, meeting many other characters from the game along the way. The anime is among those noted for sometimes depicting the characters in an exaggerated super deformed manner. After the last episode aired, it was announced an OVA was in production. The OVA was released on April 1, 2009, and actually featured all the characters in an alternate setting - that of a modern high school. The second season of anime, a series based on the second game, entitled , continue where the last season left off, aired from October 5, 2009 to December 2009. The third season began airing April 2010, titled . The first season has been licensed in North America by Sentai Filmworks; distributor Section23 Films, who released the first season on DVD on January 4, 2011. This release, however, uses the Japanese TV masters and omits improvements made to the animation for the Japanese DVD release. The second and third seasons of Koihime Muso are also licensed by Sentai Filmworks. The second season was released on March 1, 2011, while the third season was released on May 24, 2011.

Music
The visual novel has four main theme songs, one promotion theme, one opening theme, one insert song, and one ending theme. The opening theme song was "Hφwling Sφul", which was performed by Rekka Katakiri. All of the songs were composed and arranged by Takumaru, with the lyrics written by K. Bajjo.

The opening for Shin Koihime Musou is called "HE∀ting Sφul" also by Rekka Katakiri.

The anime has two theme songs. The opening theme, titled "Flower of Bravery", was performed by fripSide, and was composed and written by Chiyomaru Shikura, and arranged by Satoshi Yaginuma. The ending theme, titled  was performed by fripSide NAO project!, composed and arranged by Satoshi Yaginuma, and written by Nao, Shinichirō Yamashita, and Satoshi Yaginuma.

The anime adaptation of Shin Koihime Musou also has two theme songs. The opening is titled , also performed by Rekka Katakiri. The ending is titled  by Mai Goto, Nami Kurokawa and Miya Serizono. They also voice lead characters Ryūbi, Kan'u and Chōhi respectively.

Trivia
Koihime Musō'''s title names are allusions to Koei's Dynasty Warriors series.Koihime Musō is a play on the Japanese title of Dynasty Warriors, Sangoku Musō.
The sequel game, Shin Koihime Musō, is derived from the Dynasty Warriors games after the first one, which are called Shin Sangoku Musō in Japan.
The final game in the series, Shin Koihime Musō: Moeshōden is derived from the Xtreme Legends games for Dynasty Warriors, which are called Mōshōden'' in Japan.

References

External links
  
 PC visual novel official website at Tactics 
 PS2 visual novel official website at Yeti 
 Official Shin Koihime Musō PC visual novel website at Tactics 
 Official Shin Koihime Musō PSP visual novel website at Yeti 
 PC visual novel official website at MangaGamer

Tokyo MX original programming
2007 video games
2008 manga
Action anime and manga
Action video games
Anime series
Anime television series based on video games
Arcade video games
ASCII Media Works manga
Bishōjo games
Comedy anime and manga
Dengeki Comics
Doga Kobo
Doujin video games
Eroge
Fantasy anime and manga
Japanese LGBT-related animated television series
Koihime Musō
Manga based on video games
Pink Pineapple
PlayStation 2 games
PlayStation Portable games
Seinen manga
Sentai Filmworks
Fighting games
Video games based on Romance of the Three Kingdoms
Video games developed in Japan
Visual novels
Windows games
Works based on Romance of the Three Kingdoms
Yuri (genre) anime and manga